Jonathan Steele may refer to:
Jonathan Steele (journalist), British journalist and author
Jonathan Steele (comics), the comic book series
Jonny Steele, footballer

See also
Jon Steel, rugby league footballer
John Steele (disambiguation)